Warren Finnerty (April 9, 1925 – December 22, 1974) was an American actor best known for his Obie award-winning performance as the character "Leach" in the stage production The Connection (1959) and its film version.

Career
After making his film debut in Murder, Inc. (1960), and in the Off-Off Broadway production of The Brig in the 1960s, he made a few television appearances before starring in The Connection (1961), the film adaption of the play in which he reprised his stage role. 

He continued to work steadily in the 1960s and early 1970s, making appearances on television in Bonanza and Banacek, and in films such as The Pawnbroker (1964), Cool Hand Luke (1967), Easy Rider (1969) in which Finnerty plays a rancher whose lifestyle draws the admiration of Wyatt aka "Captain America," the character played by Peter Fonda, The Panic in Needle Park (1971), Kid Blue (1973) and Cockfighter (1974).

Finnerty died in 1974 in New York City from a heart attack at the age of 49.

Family
Finnerty's wife, Ruth, was a pianist and English educator at UC Berkeley Extension; the couple's son is the jazz musician Barry Finnerty.

Filmography

References

External links
Warren Finnerty's New York Times obituary

Warren Finnerty at the Internet Off-Broadway Database

1925 births
1974 deaths
American male film actors
American male stage actors
20th-century American male actors